The 2022 São Léo Open was a professional tennis tournament played on clay courts. It was the 3rd edition of the tournament which was part of the 2022 ATP Challenger Tour. It took place in São Leopoldo, Brazil between 14 and 20 November 2022.

Singles main-draw entrants

Seeds

 1 Rankings are as of 7 November 2022.

Other entrants
The following players received wildcards into the singles main draw:
  João Fonseca
  Gustavo Heide
  Matheus Pucinelli de Almeida

The following players received entry into the singles main draw as alternates:
  João Lucas Reis da Silva
  Thiago Seyboth Wild

The following players received entry from the qualifying draw:
  Mateus Alves
  Leo Borg
  Max Houkes
  Wilson Leite
  Juan Pablo Paz
  Damien Wenger

The following player received entry as a lucky loser:
  Eduardo Ribeiro

Champions

Singles

 Juan Pablo Varillas def.  Facundo Bagnis 7–6(7–5), 4–6, 6–4.

Doubles

 Guido Andreozzi /  Guillermo Durán def.  Felipe Meligeni Alves /  João Lucas Reis da Silva 5–1 ret.

References

2022 ATP Challenger Tour
2022
2022 in Brazilian tennis
November 2022 sports events in Brazil